Thomas Comer (1790–1862) was a British stage actor. Comer was born in Bath in Somerset.  After appearing in the West End at the Drury Lane and Covent Garden theatres, he emigrated to the United States and established himself as a leading music director, working at the Boston Theatre for many years.

Selected roles
 Lucius in Virginius by James Sheridan Knowles (1820)
 Procles in Damon and Pythias by John Banim and Richard Sheil (1821)
 Bertone in Julian by Mary Russell Mitford (1823)
De Couci in The Vespers of Palermo by Felicia Hemans (1823)
 Velaszque de Leon in Cortez by James Planché (1823)
 Army officer in Ben Nazir by Thomas Colley Grattan (1827)

References

Bibliography
 Newman, Nancy. Good Music for a Free People: The Germania Musical Society in Nineteenth-century America. University Rochester Press, 2010.
 Preston, Katherine K. Opera on the Road: Traveling Opera Troupes in the United States, 1825-60. University of Illinois Press, 1993.

19th-century British people
English male stage actors
19th-century British male actors
19th-century English male actors
1790 births
1862 deaths
People from Bath, Somerset
British emigrants to the United States